Nicola Sodano (born 31 January 1978 in Crotone) is an Italian politician.

He is a member of the centre-right party Forza Italia and was elected Mayor of Mantua at the 2010 Italian local elections. He took office on 13 April 2010 and served until 15 June 2015.

See also
2010 Italian local elections
List of mayors of Mantua

References

External links
 

1957 births
Living people
Mayors of Mantua
The People of Freedom politicians
Forza Italia politicians
Forza Italia (2013) politicians
People from Crotone